Ricardo David Páez Gómez (born February 9, 1979 in Acarigua) is a retired Venezuelan footballer.

Club career
During his career, Páez played in 10 different countries, representing mainly Estudiantes de Mérida Fútbol Club - four spells. He also played in Belgium, Argentina (although he only appeared for the reserves at Boca Juniors), México, United Arab Emirates, Ecuador, Colombia, Romania, Greece, Peru and Spain.

International career
Páez made his debut for Venezuela on August 10, 2000, during a 5–1 friendly win in Costa Rica, subsequently representing the nation in three Copa América; in the 2007 edition, as the hosts progressed through the group stages, Páez scored once in three matches.

In total, he gained 64 international caps.

International goals

|-
| 1. || September 4, 2001 || Estadio Nacional de Chile, Santiago, Chile ||  || 0–1 || 0–2 || 2002 World Cup qualification
|-
| 2. || November 20, 2002 || Brígido Iriarte, Caracas, Venezuela ||  || 1–0 || 1–0 || Friendly
|-
| 3. || April 2, 2003 || Brígido Iriarte, Caracas, Venezuela ||  || 2–0 || 2–0 || Friendly
|-
| 4. || February 9, 2005 || José Pachencho Romero, Maracaibo, Venezuela ||  || 1–0 || 3–0 || Friendly
|-
| 5. || March 28, 2007 || José Pachencho Romero, Maracaibo, Venezuela ||  || 1–0 || 5–0 || Friendly
|-
| 6. || June 26, 2007 || Pueblo Nuevo, San Cristóbal, Venezuela ||  || 2–1 || 2–2 || 2007 Copa América
|}

Personal life
Páez's father, Richard, was once coach of the national team.

External links
 
 International appearances, at RSSSF
 Guardian Stats Centre
 
 Futbolme profile 

1979 births
Living people
Venezuelan footballers
Association football midfielders
Standard Liège players
Estudiantes de Mérida players
Boca Juniors footballers
Club Atlético Lanús footballers
Deportivo Táchira F.C. players
San Luis F.C. players
UA Maracaibo players
Baniyas Club players
Barcelona S.C. footballers
América de Cali footballers
Deportivo Pereira footballers
FC Politehnica Timișoara players
PAS Giannina F.C. players
Veria F.C. players
Club Alianza Lima footballers
Club Deportivo Universidad César Vallejo footballers
CD Castellón footballers
A.C.C.D. Mineros de Guayana players
Peruvian Primera División players
Venezuelan Primera División players
Categoría Primera A players
Liga I players
Super League Greece players
Segunda División players
Venezuela international footballers
2001 Copa América players
2004 Copa América players
2007 Copa América players
Venezuelan expatriate footballers
Expatriate footballers in Belgium
Expatriate footballers in Argentina
Expatriate footballers in Mexico
Expatriate footballers in the United Arab Emirates
Expatriate footballers in Ecuador
Expatriate footballers in Colombia
Expatriate footballers in Romania
Expatriate footballers in Greece
Expatriate footballers in Peru
Expatriate footballers in Spain
Venezuelan expatriate sportspeople in Belgium
Venezuelan expatriate sportspeople in Argentina
Venezuelan expatriate sportspeople in Mexico
Venezuelan expatriate sportspeople in the United Arab Emirates
Venezuelan expatriate sportspeople in Ecuador
Venezuelan expatriate sportspeople in Colombia
Venezuelan expatriate sportspeople in Romania
Venezuelan expatriate sportspeople in Greece
Venezuelan expatriate sportspeople in Peru
Venezuelan expatriate sportspeople in Spain
UAE First Division League players
People from Acarigua